Webster's Falls, noted for its panoramas, is a  classical curtain/ plunge waterfall found in the Spencer Gorge/Webster's Falls Conservation Area in Hamilton, Ontario, Canada. The water flows down Spencer Creek. In the past the falls have been known by various names such as Dr. Hamilton's Falls, Spencer Falls, Hart Falls, Fisher Falls and Flamborough Falls.

The cobblestone footbridge, as well as a newer and narrower stone/concrete footbridge, crosses over Spencer Creek to the west side. A shuttle service now runs between a large parking area just outside Dundas and Spencer Gorge/Webster Falls Conservation Area, for visitors to access this popular conservation area on weekends and holidays from Saturday, May 13 to Sunday, October 29, 2017.

"Baby Webster's Falls"
Baby Webster's Falls is a complex ribbon waterfall which has water mainly during seasonal storms and after the winter snow melts. Its height is 20 metres and its width is 3 metres (10 ft) It is located on a tributary of the Spencer Creek, on a separate ravine near Webster's Falls and can be seen from the top of the gorge.

Hamilton Firefighters have performed a total of 163 rope rescues between 2005 and August 2016, many of which have occurred at Webster's and Tew's falls. In 2016, two deaths had occurred at Hamilton waterfalls by July.

Images

See also
List of waterfalls in Hamilton, Ontario

References

External links
 Waterfalls of Ontario - Webster's Falls
 Cascades and Waterfalls of Hamilton (www.waterfalls.hamilton.ca)
 Hamilton- "The Waterfall Capital of the World" (www.cityofwaterfalls.ca)
 Vintage Postcards: Waterfalls in and around Hamilton, Ontario

Maps
 Hamilton Waterfall Map PDF. (http://map.hamilton.ca)

Video clip
 YouTube: Waterfalls of Hamilton, Ontario & the Niagara Escarpment

Waterfalls of Hamilton, Ontario
Dundas, Ontario